Colin Gerald Dryden Thubron,  FRAS (born 14 June 1939) is a British travel writer and novelist. In 2008, The Times ranked him among the 50 greatest postwar British writers. He is a contributor to The New York Review of Books, The Times, The Times Literary Supplement and The New York Times.  His books have been translated into more than twenty languages. Thubron was appointed a CBE in the 2007 New Year Honours.  He is a Fellow and, between 2009 and 2017, was President of the Royal Society of Literature.

Early years
Thubron is the son of Brigadier Gerald Thubron and of Evelyn (née Dryden), a collateral descendant of the poet John Dryden and of Samuel Morse, inventor of the Morse Code. He was born in London and educated at Eton College. Before becoming a writer he worked for five years in publishing in London and New York City, and made independent documentary films that were shown on BBC television.  He is married to the Shakespeare scholar Margreta de Grazia.

The Middle East
Thubron's first travel book, Mirror to Damascus, was published in 1967, the first such book on the city for a century. It was followed the next year by The Hills of Adonis: A Quest in Lebanon, a lyrical account of a journey through the country, pre-civil war, and the next year by Jerusalem.  While starting a parallel career as a novelist, he completed a travel book on Cyprus, Journey into Cyprus, in 1974, just before Turkey invaded the island.

Russia and the Far East

In 1981, during the Brezhnev era, Thubron broke with his earlier work (on cities and small countries) and travelled by car into the Soviet Union, a journey recorded in Among the Russians.  This was followed in 1987 by Behind the Wall: A Journey Through China (winner of the Hawthornden Prize and the Thomas Cook Travel Book Award), and in 1994 by The Lost Heart of Asia, the record of a journey through the newly independent nations of Central Asia.

In 1999 came In Siberia(Prix Bouvier, France), an exploration of the farthest reaches of the ex-Soviet Union, and in 2007, Shadow of the Silk Road, which describes a 7,000-mile journey from China to the Mediterranean encompassing cultures that Thubron has been obsessed with: Islam, China, the former Soviet Union, Central Asia, Afghanistan, Iran and Turkey. His latest work is The Amur River: Between Russia and China (2021).

Writing
Most of Thubron's novels are notably different from his travel books.  Several describe settings of enforced immobility: a psychiatric hospital, a prison, an amnesiac's mind.  Notable among them are Emperor (1978), a study of the conversion of Constantine, A Cruel Madness (winner of the PEN/Macmillan Silver Pen Award), and Falling (1989).  Others, however, use travel or a fictional abroad: Turning Back the Sun (1991) and an imaginary journey to Vilcabamba, Peru in To the Last City (2002), long-listed for the Man Booker Prize. It has been described as a "Heart of Darkness narrative" in a "Marquezian setting". His most recent novel, Night of Fire, is his most ambitious: a multi-layered study of time and memory, which several reviewers named his masterpiece.

Thubron says that he was influenced by Palgrave's Golden Treasury as a schoolboy, and was initially inspired by the travel writing of Patrick Leigh Fermor, Jan Morris and Freya Stark. He admires the English novelist William Golding and chose Victor Gollancz's anthology A Year of Grace as his book for Desert Island Discs.

Travel Writing 
Mirror to Damascus – Heinemann, 1967
The Hills of Adonis: A Quest in Lebanon – Heinemann, 1968
Jerusalem – Heinemann, 1969
Journey into Cyprus – Heinemann, 1975
 Jerusalem – Time-Life, 1976
Istanbul – Time-Life, 1978
The Venetians – Time-Life, 1980
The Ancient Mariners – Time-Life, 1981
The Royal Opera House, Covent Garden – Hamish Hamilton, 1982
Among the Russians – Heinemann, 1983
Where Nights Are Longest: Travels by Car Through Western Russia – Atlantic Monthly Press, 1984
Behind the Wall: A Journey through China – Heinemann, 1987 
The Silk Road: Beyond the Celestial Kingdom – Simon & Schuster, 1989
The Lost Heart of Asia – Heinemann, 1994
In Siberia – Chatto & Windus, 1999
Shadow of the Silk Road, Chatto & Windus, 2006
To a Mountain in Tibet, Chatto & Windus, 2011
The Amur River: Between Russia and China, Chatto & Windus, 2021

Forewords:Views from Abroad: The Spectator Book of Travel Writing, edited by Philip Marsden-Smedley & Jeffrey Klinke – Grafton, 1988The Lycian Shore by Freya Stark – John Murray, 2002The Road to Oxiana by Robert Byron – Penguin, 2007Stalin's Nose – by Rory MacLean – Tauris Parke, 2008The Travels of Marco Polo – Everyman, 2008

NovelsThe God in the Mountain - Heinemann, 1977Emperor – Heinemann, 1978A Cruel Madness – Heinemann, 1984Falling – Heinemann, 1989Turning Back the Sun – Heinemann, 1991Distance – Heinemann, 1996To the Last City – Chatto & Windus, 2002 Night of Fire - Chatto & Windus, 2016

Radio adaptations, stage and televisionEmperor - BBC Radio 4, September 1984, with Martin Jarvis as Constantine and Juliet Stevenson as Fausta.Great Journeys: The Silk Road – BBC 2 Television, presenter, 1989The Prince of the Pagodas - ballet scenario, the Royal Opera House, 1989, choreographed by Kenneth MacMillanA Cruel Madness – BBC Radio 4, May 1992, with Robert Glenister as Pashley and Harriet Walter as SophiaThe South Bank Show – Time seen as a Road, on Colin Thubron, ITV television, 1992

Prizes and awards
1967 Book Society Choice, Mirror to Damascus1969 Fellow of the Royal Society of Literature
1985 PEN/Macmillan Silver Pen Award, A Cruel Madness1988 Hawthornden Prize, Behind the Wall: A journey through China1988 Thomas Cook Travel Book Award, Behind the Wall: A Journey through China1991 Fellow of the Royal Asiatic Society
2000 Mungo Park Medal of the Royal Scottish Geographical Society 
2001 Lawrence of Arabia Memorial Medal of the Royal Society for Asian Affairs
2002 Hon.D Lit University of Warwick
2003-9 Vice-President, The Royal Society of Literature
2007 Commander of the Order of the British Empire (CBE), New Year's Honours
2008 Society of Authors Travel Award
2009–2017 President, The Royal Society of Literature
2010 Prix Bouvier, France, In Siberia2011 Ness Award of the Royal Geographical Society
2014 International Prize, Spanish Geographical Society
2019 Edward Stanford Outstanding Contribution to Travel Writing Award
2020  RSL Companion of Literature
2021 Il Premio Chatwin, Italy
2021 Stanford Dolman Travel Book of the Year: The Amur River References 

 External links 
Thubron author page and archive from The New York Review of BooksSusan Bassnett: Interview with Colin Thubron, Studies in Travel Writing, No 3, 1999
Interview: The Guardian: https://www.theguardian.com/books/2000/sep/23/travel.travelbooks
Overview: British Council: https://web.archive.org/web/20131113194125/http://literature.britishcouncil.org/colin-thubron
Interview: The Independent: https://web.archive.org/web/20121105020336/http://www.highbeam.com/doc/1P2-5039074.html
Interview:http://www.bookrags.com/ColinThubron – United StatesThe Cambridge Companion to Travel Writing ed. Hulme and Youngs, CUP, 2002, pp. 95–6
Interview: The Sunday Times: http://www.accessinterviews.com/interviews/detail/colin-thubron/4256The New York Review of Books: The Amazing Wanderer: http://www.nybooks.com/articles/archives/2007/dec/20/the-amazing-wanderer/
Review: https://www.nytimes.com/2007/07/15/books/review/Adams.htmlThe Times: http://entertainment.timesonline.co.uk/tol/arts_and_entertainment/books/article3127347.ece
Interview: ''''The Geographical Magazine: https://web.archive.org/web/20100201172301/http://www.geographical.co.uk/Magazine/People/Colin_Thubron_-_May_2007.html
Debrett's People of Today

1939 births
Writers from London
Living people
People educated at Eton College
20th-century English novelists
21st-century English novelists
English travel writers
Fellows of the Royal Astronomical Society
Fellows of the Royal Society of Literature
Presidents of the Royal Society of Literature
Commanders of the Order of the British Empire
English male novelists
20th-century English male writers
21st-century English male writers
English male non-fiction writers